Major General Brian Matauru Poananga,  (2 December 1924 – 5 September 1995) was a New Zealand sportsman, military leader and diplomat. Of Māori descent, he identified with the Ngāti Porou and Rangitāne iwi. He was born in Palmerston North, Manawatu, in 1924. He was educated at Palmerston North Boys' High School.

In the 1962 Queen's Birthday Honours, Poananga was appointed a Member of the Order of the British Empire (Military Division). He was promoted to Officer of the Order of the British Empire in the 1968 Queen's Birthday Honours, and further promoted to Commander of the same Order in the 1978 New Year Honours. In the 1980 Queen's Birthday Honours, he was appointed a Companion of the Order of the Bath.

References

 

1924 births
1995 deaths
New Zealand military personnel
New Zealand Commanders of the Order of the British Empire
New Zealand Companions of the Order of the Bath
High Commissioners of New Zealand to Papua New Guinea
New Zealand generals
New Zealand Māori sportspeople
New Zealand military personnel of the Korean War
New Zealand military personnel of the Malayan Emergency
New Zealand military personnel of World War II
New Zealand sportsmen
Ngāti Porou people
People educated at Palmerston North Boys' High School
People from Palmerston North
Rangitāne people
New Zealand Māori soldiers